Samuel J. McElroy House is a historic home located near Huntersville, Mecklenburg County, North Carolina. It was built about 1885, and is a two-story, "T"-shaped vernacular Victorian style frame farmhouse. It has gable roof and features a porch with original decorative woodwork.  It has a one-story rear kitchen wing and a smokehouse. Also on the property is a contributing tack house (c. 1885).

It was listed on the National Register of Historic Places in 1991.

References

Houses on the National Register of Historic Places in North Carolina
Victorian architecture in North Carolina
Houses completed in 1885
Houses in Charlotte, North Carolina
National Register of Historic Places in Mecklenburg County, North Carolina